Lobocraspeda is a genus of moths in the family Geometridae first described by Warren in 1897.

Cladogram according to the Catalogue of Life:

References

Geometridae